Adrian Smith (born 1957) is an English musician, member of the band Iron Maiden.

Adrian Smith may also refer to:

Adrian Smith (politician) (born 1970), United States representative from Nebraska's 3rd congressional district
Adrian Smith (statistician) (born 1946), English statistician and academic
Adrian Smith (architect) (born 1944), American architect
Adrian Smith (basketball) (born 1936), American professional basketball player
Adrian Smith (illustrator), British illustrator of game materials
Adrian Smith (strongman) (born 1964), professional strongman competitor for Great Britain